= Swapnapheri =

Bengali theatre group

Shorantor
- Formation: 21 February 2001.
- Type: Theatre group
- Location: Kolkata, India
- Members: Biswarup Chatterjee, Dr Debabrata Chakraborty, Syed Merazul Hoque, Debjani Chakraborty, Rashedul Islam Khan, Debabrata Roy, Rimi Akter, Shruti Das, Sourabh Poyra, Tanmoy Biswas, Suman Das, Abdul Rahaman Biswas, Mousumi Dutta, Emdadul Hoque Milon, Aninda Das, Tanmoy Chowdhury, Toukir Ahmed
- Website: www.swapnapheri.webs.com www.natokerkotha.webs.com

Swapnapheri (Bengali: স্বপ্নফেরী) is a Bengali theatre group. The theatre group was founded on 21 February 2001. Swapnapheri has been marked by the acting and directorial of Dr. Debabrata Chakraborty and the Organization Secretary Biswarup Chatterjee.

== Performance ==
From 2001, Swapnapheri began performing on a regular basis. This eliminated their need to wait in the queue for free slots at major theatres like the Academy of Fine Arts, Shilpokala Academy, etc.

== Major productions ==
Till April 2012 Swapnapheri has performed many plays. Some of those are listed below:

- Charandas Choor by Debabrata Chakraborty
- Murti by Debabrata Chakraborty
- Kichukkhon by Debabrata Chakraborty
- Raja (Rabindra Natayak) by Debabrata Chakraborty
- Basanta Utsav (Rabindra Natayak)by Debabrata Chakraborty
- Taser Desh (Rabindra Natayak) by Biswarup Chatterjee
- Sesher Ratri (Rabindra Natayak)by Debabrata Chakraborty
- Ghu Ghu by Debabrata Chakraborty
- Vulval NEWS by Biswarup Chatterjee
- Ayna by Biswarup Chatterjee

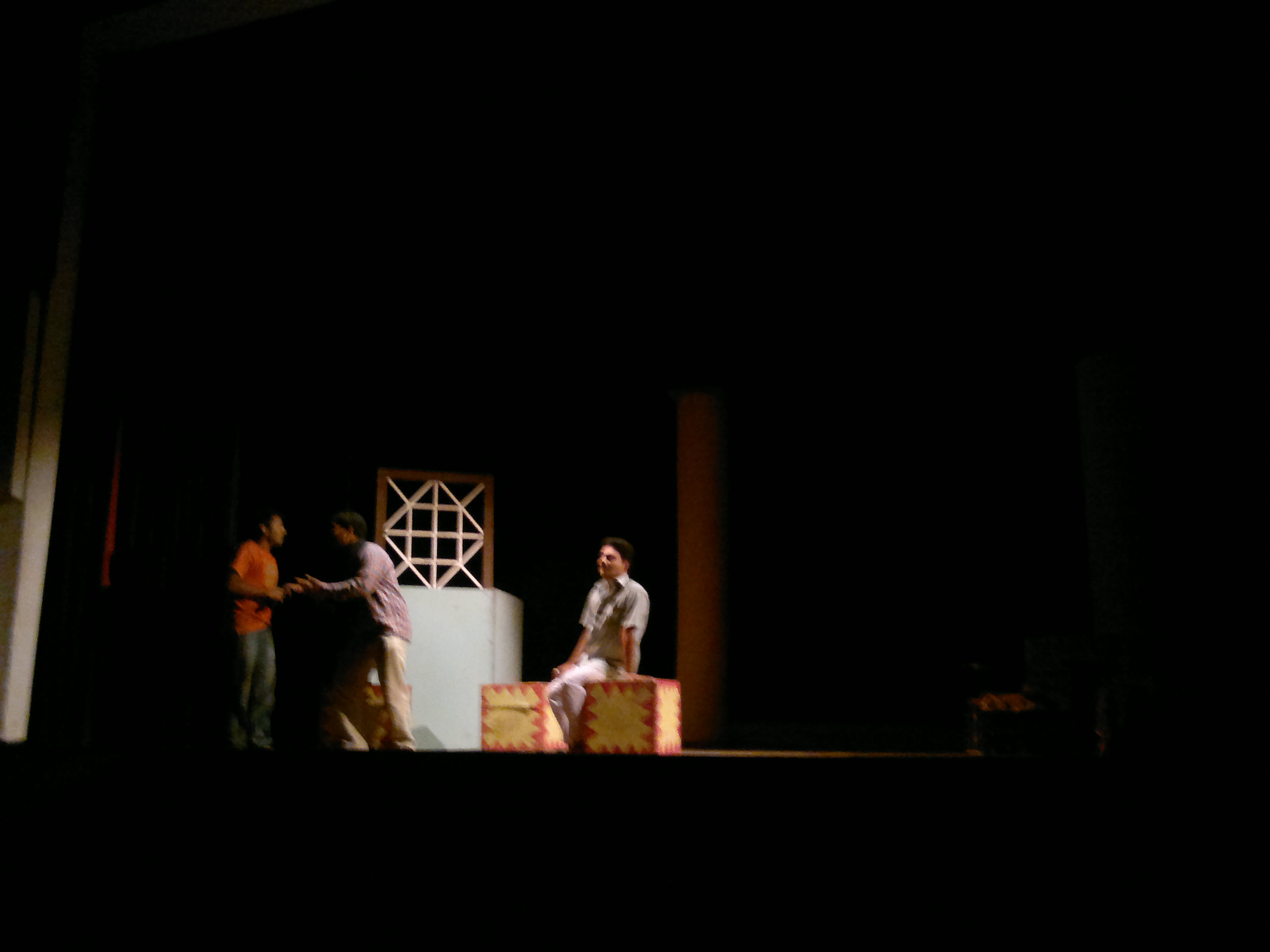
One of the scenes on Swapnapheri show

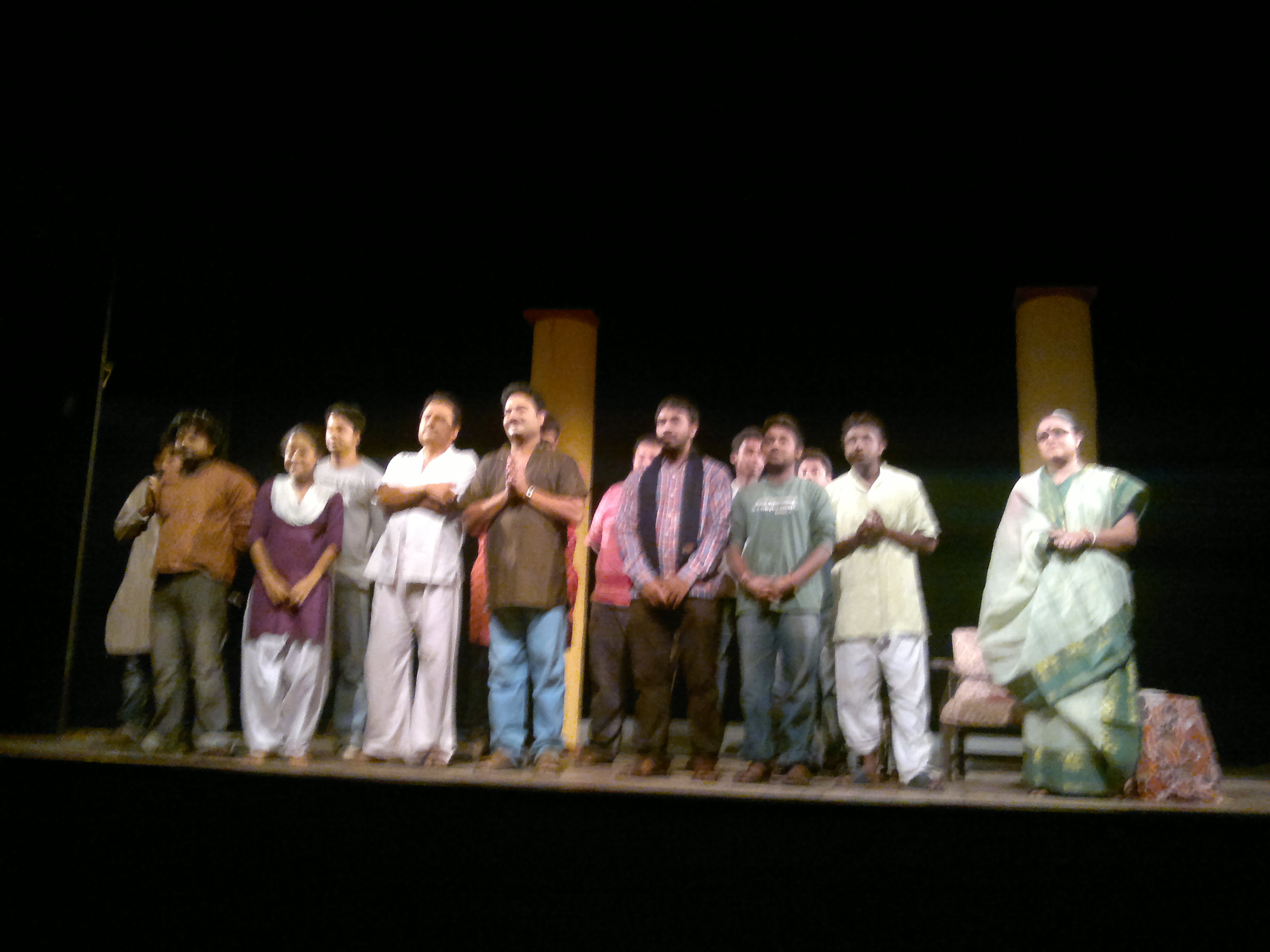
The final image taken on Swapnapheri show at the end

== Committee and members ==
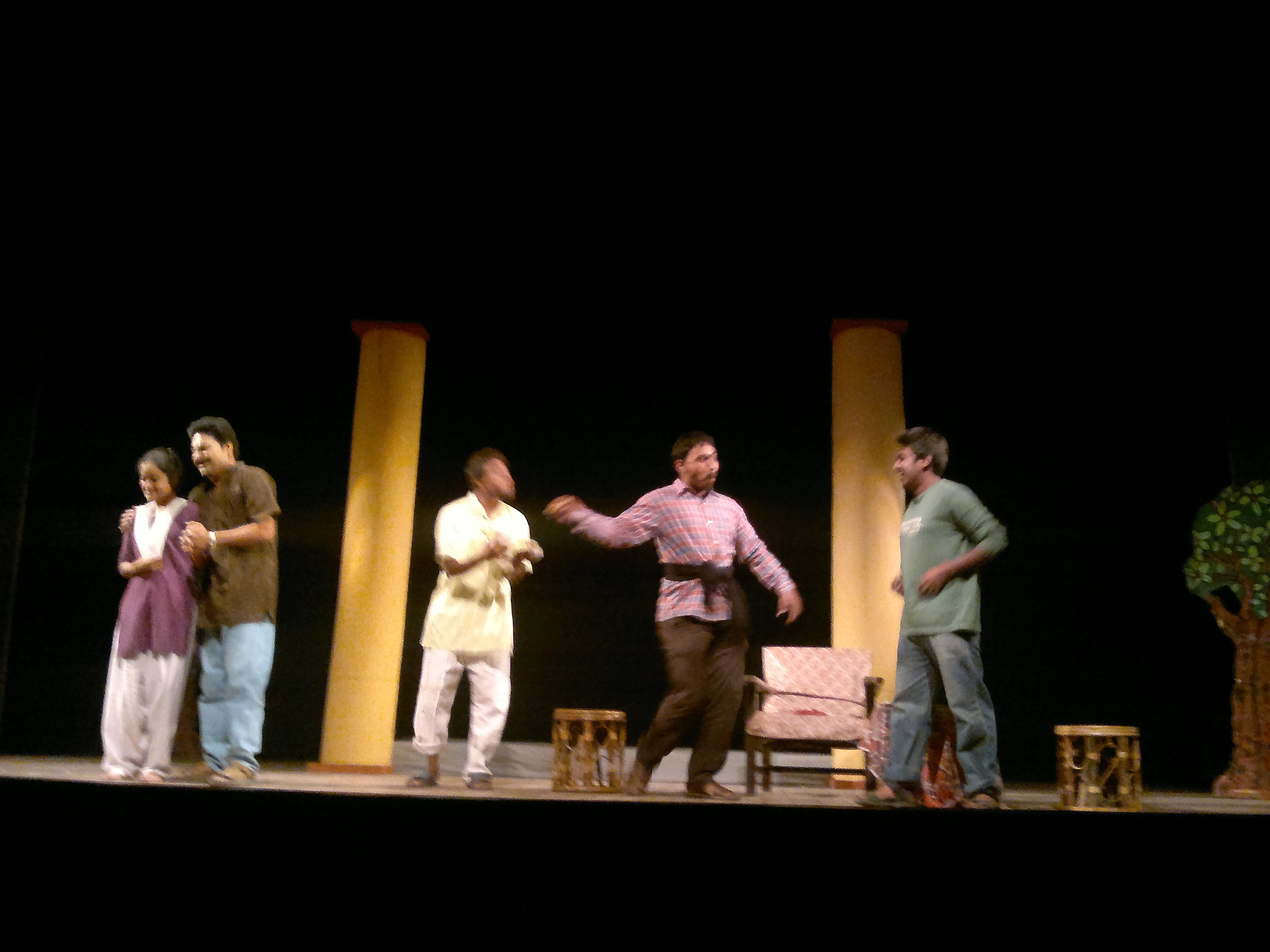
- Image taken on Swapnapheri show
  President : Dr. Debabrata Chakraborty
- Secretary : Biswarup Chatterjee
- Accountant : Debjani Chakraborty

Members

- Biswarup Chatterjee, Dr Debabrata Chakraborty, Syed Merazul Hoque, Debjani Chakraborty, Rashedul Islam Khan, Debabrata Roy, Rimi Akter, Shruti Das, Sourabh Poyra, Tanmoy Biswas, Suman Das, Abdul Rahaman Biswas, Mousumi Dutta, Emdadul Hoque Milon, Aninda Das, Tanmoy Chowdhury, Toukir Ahmed
